Thaika Shuaib (29 July 1930 – 14 June 2021) was a South Indian Islamic scholar, spiritual guide, and author. In May 1994, he became the first Tamil Muslim to receive the National Award for "Outstanding Arabic Scholar". He was mentioned as one of The 500 Most Influential Muslims in the 2013/14, 2014/15, 2016, 2017, 2018, 2019 and 2020 lists.

Background
Shuaib was born in Kilakarai, South India. He comes from a family of Islamic scholars who have taught the Islamic sciences for centuries. His father, Thaika Ahmad Abdul Qadir (d. 1976) was a scholar and spiritual guide. His grandfather, Shahul Hamid (d. 1921) was a scholar and missionary. His granduncle was the ascetic and poet Abdul Qadir (d. 1913), and his great-grandfather was the renewer Sayyid Muhammad (d. 1316), widely known as "Imam al-‘Arus" or "Mappillai Lebbai Alim". Amongst Shuaib's predecessors is the founder of the Arusiyyah Seminary, Sadaqatullah al-Qahiri.

He is a descendant of the Caliph Abu Bakr, tracing his lineage through Sadaq Maraikkayar, (a companion of Nagore Shahul Hamid), who was a descendant of Muhammad Khalji.

Education
Shuaib's father took care of his upbringing at the Arusiyyah Seminary, and he was both his teacher and spiritual master. His father gave him several ijazah, or certificates of authority to teach Islamic law. After completing the traditional curriculum, he sat with the scholars of Al-Baqiyat As-Salihat Seminary and Jamalia Arabic College in South India, and Darul Uloom Deoband and Jamia Millia Islamia in North India.

He read Arabic and Persian at the University of Ceylon (Peradeniya). His research of the Arwi (Southern India and Sri Lanka) region earned him a M. A. and then a PhD from the Columbia Pacific University.

Initiation
Shuaib received training from his father in Sufism, until he attained qualification as a murshid and the rank of a spiritual master in the Sufi tradition. He inherited the mantle of the Arusiyya branch of the Qadiriyya tariqa. He further received authorisation from Abdul Karim al-Kasnazani.

Career
Shuaib started teaching Arabic language and Qur'an studies at the Arusiyyah Seminary whilst still at high school. He entered the teaching profession full-time after graduation.

Shuaib is a part of the traditional family business of trading in precious gems and stones.

Research
Shuaib's primary research focus was history of Islam and Muslims in the Arwi region (modern day South India and Sri Lanka). His findings were the bedrock for his master's thesis and research doctorate which culminated in the publishing of the 880-page work, "Arabic, Arwi and Persian in Sarandib and Tamil Nadu – A study of the Contributions of Sri Lanka and Tamil Nadu to Arabic, Arwi, Persian and Urdu Languages, Literature and Education". The book was released by the presidents of 3 SAARC countries in their respective official residences viz. India, Sri Lanka and Maldives.

The book recorded the history and contributions of Arwi (Tamil-speaking) Muslims to Islamic literature, education, propagation and spirituality through Arabic, Arwi, Persian and Urdu. It shed light on their cultural, political and social activities and achievements in their respective countries and abroad. It also featured a critical commentary of the Mawlid composition of Imam al-‘Arus Sayyid Muhammad b. Ahmad Lebbai entitled, "Minhat al-Sarandīb fī Madh al-Habīb".

Publications
Shuaib has authored 4 major works and 7 minor treatises. He has published 11 bilingual articles addressing polemical issues that engulfed the Tamil Muslim community in the 80's and 90's. His arrangement of the Arusi-Qadiri liturgy "Ratib Jalaliyya" has more than 500,000 copies in circulation while his prayer book "Al Munjiyath" has had 6 prints of 37,000 copies since 2006.

Major works
Arabic, Arwi, and Persian in Sarandib and Tamil Nadu: A Study of the Contributions of Sri Lanka and Tamil Nadu to Arabic, Arwi, Persian, and Urdu Languages, Literature, and Education, Madras:1993
Al Munjiyath: A Panacea for the Body and Soul, Chennai:2014
ahsanu-l mawa'iz wa azyanu-l malafiz, Kilakkarai:1954
Ratib Jalaliyya, Chennai, Colombo, Penang
Morning and Evening Invocations, USA and Singapore:2021

Minor treatises
If not for the Prophet ﷺ (English), Kilakkarai:1956
Sacred Hajj and Pious Ziyara (English), Chennai:2007
Nithya Kadan – நித்திய கடன் (Tamil), Kilakkarai:1948
Maanbu Mikka Ramadan – மான்பு மிக்க றமளான் (Tamil), Kilakkarai:1955
Nabi Thondri Iraa Vittaal – நபி ﷺ தோன்றியிரா விட்டால் (Tamil), Kilakkarai:1955
Adhan–Iqamattin Sirappu – அதான் இகாமத்தின் சிறப்பு (Tamil), Madras:1995
Punitha Haj: Azhagiya Vazhimurai – புனித ஹஜ்ஜு : அழகிய வழிமுறை (Tamil), Chennai:2007
Thirumaraiyil Thiruthuthar – திருமறையில் திருத்தூதர் (Tamil), Singapore:2020

Articles
Secular Education vs Religious Instruction
Schools of Jurisprudence (Fiqh) 
Men Covering the Head
Congregational Supplication (Du'a)
Kissing the Thumbs and Wiping the Eyes during the Call to Prayer (Adhan)
Reciting the Qur’an without Understanding – Will it benefit the Dead or the Living? 
Intercession (Wasila)
Gifting of Deeds (Isaluth Thawab)
Innovation (Bid’a)
Reminding the Deceased (Talqin)
Vows (Nadhr)

Recognition
On 7 May 1994, the 9th President of India, Shankar Dayal Sharma, presented Shuaib with the "National Award for Outstanding Arabic Scholar" – a first for a Tamil Muslim Islamic scholar.

In 2013, Shuaib was listed for the first time in The 500 Most Influential Muslims by Georgetown University’s Prince Alwaleed Bin-Talal Center for Muslim-Christian Understanding and the Royal Islamic Strategic Studies Centre of Jordan.

On 27 April 2016, the 7th President of Sri Lanka, Maithripala Sirisena, was the guest of honour at a function in Colombo, Sri Lanka, to felicitate Shuaib for his services rendered to Islam and for promotion of religious harmony.

Death
Shuaib passed away on Tuesday, 15 June 2021, corresponding to the Hijri date 3 Dhu'l Qa'dah 1442. The following day, in the presence of family, friends and disciples, his funeral prayer was led by his son Thaika Muhammad Sadaqah at the Arusiyya Tekke where he was laid to rest with his forefathers.

See also

Arusiyyah Madrasah
Arwi or Arabic-Tamil
Tamil Muslim
Thaika Ahmad Abdul Qadir
Shafi'i
Qadiriyya
Sufism

Further reading

External links
ask4dua – Shaikh Dr Thaika Shuaib's web initiative for mutual prayers.
TAQWA (Singapore) – Singapore chapter of the Arusi Qadiri Tariqa, of which Shaikh Dr Thaika Shuaib is the Patron.
Arusi Qadiri Sufi Path – Biographies of the Arusi Qadiri spiritual masters.
Ratib Jalaliyya – The liturgical work recited in Arusi Qadiri public gatherings.
Dinakaran Daily Newspaper (Tamil) – உலகளவில் செல்வாக்குள்ள 500 இஸ்லாமியர்களில் ராமநாதபுரம் மாவட்டத்தை சேர்ந்தவர் தேர்வு

References

1930 births
2021 deaths
Indian Sufis
Islam in Tamil Nadu
People from Tamil Nadu
20th-century Muslim scholars of Islam
Qadiri order
Scholars of Sufism
Indian Sufi religious leaders
Sunni Sufis
Alumni of the University of Ceylon
Columbia Pacific University alumni
Recipients of the National Teacher's Award India